Fable Fortune was a free-to-play digital collectible card game set in the Fable universe. The game was released for Windows and Xbox One in February 2018, after an initial early access release. It was co-developed by Flaming Fowl Studios and Mediatonic.  In late 2019, Flaming Fowl Studios announced their intent to cease work on further updates for the game, citing game's lacklustre performance on the market. The support for the game was finally discontinued on 4 March 2020.

Gameplay
Fable Fortune is a digital collectible card game.

Development and release
Development for the game began at Lionhead Studios 18 months prior to the studio's closure in April 2016. Microsoft offered the Fable license to Flaming Fowl Studios, an independent developer formed of former Lionhead staff to continue its development. Flaming Fowl turned to a Kickstarter crowdfunding campaign in May 2016, looking to raise £250,000 towards the game's development costs. The campaign failed its target and was cancelled in June. Flaming Fowl CEO Craig Oman cited difficulties in crowdfunding a free-to-play title, and the unfamiliar genre for the Fable universe as reasons for the failure. The game did however attract private funding, allowing its development to continue. The game was released as early access for Windows and Xbox One in July 2017, and was co-developed by Flaming Fowl Studios and Mediatonic. The game launched out of early access on 22 February 2018.

Reception

Fable Fortune received a mixed reception from critics.

References

2018 video games
Cooperative video games
Early access video games
Free-to-play video games
Digital collectible card games
Video games developed in the United Kingdom
Video games with cross-platform play
Windows games
Xbox One games
Xbox Play Anywhere games
Crowdfunding projects